Võ Hoàng Yến  (born October 29, 1988) is a Vietnamese beauty pageant contestant, model and occasional actress. She won the Vietnam Supermodel 2008 contest and is the 1st runner-up of Miss Universe Vietnam 2008. She represented Vietnam in the Miss Universe 2009 pageant in the Bahamas.

Biography 
At the starting point of career, she competed Miss Vietnam Photogenic 2006 and finished in the Top 10. Afterward, she entered entertainment as a model.

She was rated to be one of the top potential contestant of Vietnam Supermodel 2008 as she later won the gold medal. She also received the award for the highest vote from the audience.

She was a runner up of Miss Universe Vietnam 2008.

She represented Vietnam for Miss Universe 2009 at Bahamas but unplaced.

Miss Universe Vietnam 2008
The winner: Nguyễn Thùy Lâm (Thái Bình), competed in Miss Universe 2008 and was one of the 15 semi-finalists.
 1st runner-up: Võ Hoàng Yến (Saigon), participated in Miss Universe 2009.
 2nd runner-up: Dương Trương Thiên Lý (Đồng Tháp), joined Miss World 2008 and won the Miss People's Choice Award.

Miss Universe 2009
A controversy made headlines when the Ministry of Culture passed a regulation that allowed only one national pageant to be held in one year. This year, 2009, the license was given to the Mrs. Vietnam contest.

The Hoan Vu company, which organized the 2008 Miss Universe contest in Nha Trang, picked Hoàng Yến, who had been the 1st runner-up, to compete at Miss Universe 2009 in the Bahamas. In final night on August 23, 2009 she failed to place into Top 15. No contestant competing from Asia made the first cut in Miss Universe 2009 and the first time since Miss Universe 1991.

F-Academy 2016 
F-Academy Program is to search young models for Vietnam fashion industry specifically and for FashionTV channel of Asia-Pacific generally. She was a judge on the show. Later she announced her retirement from modelling to pursue DJing and singing. Therefore, her presence as a judge for this show gained much attention.

Vietnam's Next Top Model 2017 - Goddess Bigo 2017 - Consultant of Miss Universe 2017 - Perfect Global Beauty 2017 
In 2017, she had a come back after long time hiatus on catwalk as she accepted to be consultant and judge of Vietnam's Next Top Model (season 8) - All Stars Season.

She continued to collaborate with TV host Tung Leo and Miss Vietnam runner up Huyen My as a judge trio for the contest Goddess Trio 2017.

After the attendance as a judge of Vietnam's Next Top Model 2017, she continued to work on Miss Universe Vietnam 2017. The organization gave a sneak peek for her attendance as a consultant as well as judge for catwalk segment of Top 70 Most Excellent Contestant from North and South.

In the final night of Miss Perfect Global Beauty 2017 directed by director Le Viet was operated at Grand Theater of Entertainment Complex of 5 Star Hotel Grand Walkerhill Seoul, Korea in December 8 with the attendance of 30 Vietnamese girls who was living, studying an working at many countries all over the world. With the attendance of more than 300 guests, the contest ran smoothly to the very end. Vietnam Ambassador of Korea Nguyen Vu Tu and his wife also invited. The judge included Miss Businesswoman 2015 runner up CEO JollieD Mai Dieu Linh; actress, movie producer and Miss Global Fashion 1998 Truong Ngoc Anh; actor and TV host Phan Anh; supermodel and Miss Universe Vietnam 2008 runner up Vo Hoang Yen; fashion designer Nguyen Minh Quan; fashion designer - fashion professor Lie Sang Boong; chief editor of W Magazine Korea Lee Hye Joo and chief doctor Kim Sang Woo of Lavian Korea.

Singles discography 

 "Hãy nói với em (Please Tell Me)" (2013)
 "Young" (2017)

Filmography 

 Acapella (2007)
Những chàng trai và những cô gái (All the Boys and Girls)

References

External links
Vietnam Super Model 2008

1988 births
Living people
Miss Universe 2009 contestants
People from Ho Chi Minh City
Vietnamese beauty pageant winners